Jukumarini (Aymara jukumari bear, -ni a suffix to indicate ownership, "the one with a bear", Hispanicized spelling Jucumarini) is a  mountain in the Bolivian Andes. It is situated in the La Paz Department, Murillo Province, Palca Municipality, near the border with the Sud Yungas Province, Irupana Municipality. Jukumarini lies southeast of  Illimani, northeast of the village of Jukumarini (Jucumarini). The peak northeast of it is named K'usill Willk'i.

References 

Mountains of La Paz Department (Bolivia)